Our Miss Brooks is an American sitcom starring Eve Arden as a sardonic high-school English teacher. It began as a radio show broadcast on CBS from 1948 to 1957. When the show was adapted to television (1952–56), it became one of the medium's earliest hits. In 1956, the sitcom was adapted for the big screen in the film of the same name.

Characters
  (Eve Arden) is an English teacher at fictional Madison High School.
  (Gale Gordon) is the gruff and unsympathetic principal of Madison High, a near-constant pain to his faculty and students. (Conklin was played by Joseph Forte in the show's first episode; Gordon succeeded him for the rest of the series' run.) Conklin would often abuse his authority to make teachers work extra hours or perform personal favors for him.
  (Jeff Chandler on radio, billed sometimes under his birth name Ira Grossel; Robert Rockwell on both radio and television), is a Madison High biology teacher, the shy and often-clueless object of Miss Brooks' affections.
  (Richard Crenna, billed at the time as Dick Crenna), is a Madison High student, well intentioned and clumsy, with a nasally, high-pitched voice, which he can disguise when making mischief, often driving Miss Brooks (his self-professed favorite teacher) to school in a broken-down jalopy. Perfectly aware of Miss Brooks' feelings, he tirelessly tries to help her snare Mr. Boynton, despite the latter's cluelessness.  
  (Jane Morgan), Miss Brooks' absentminded landlady, has two trademarks— a penchant for whipping up exotic and often inedible breakfasts, and a tendency to lose her train of thought midsentence.
  (Gloria McMillan) is a Madison High student and daughter of Osgood Conklin. A sometime love interest for Walter Denton, Harriet is sweet, honest, and guileless, unlike her father.
  (Leonard Smith) is a dull-witted Madison High athletic star and Walter's best friend. For part of the first and the entire second TV season, the character is replaced by Stretch's equally dim brother Bones (Eddie Riley).
  (Mary Jane Croft) is a Madison High English teacher and a scheming professional and romantic rival to Miss Brooks.
  (Isabel Randolph) was introduced as the new school principal in the episode "Big Ears" (November 4, 1955).
  is Mrs. Davis' cat. In the radio series, Minerva had the habit of sleeping inside Mrs. Davis' parlor piano, leading to a running gag of an impressive piano riff anytime something startled her awake.

Radio

Our Miss Brooks was a hit on radio from the outset; within eight months of its launch as a regular series, the show landed several honors, including four for Eve Arden, who won polls in four individual publications of the time. Arden had actually been the third choice to play the title role. Harry Ackerman, at the time CBS's West Coast director of programming, wanted Shirley Booth for the part, but as he told historian Gerald Nachman many years later, he realized Booth was too focused on the underpaid downside of public school teaching at the time to have fun with the role.
Lucille Ball was believed to have been the next choice, but she was committed to My Favorite Husband and did not audition.  CBS then-chairman Bill Paley, who was friendly with Arden, persuaded her to audition for the part. With a slightly rewritten audition script—Osgood Conklin, for example, was originally written as a school board president, but was now written as the incoming new Madison principal—Arden agreed to give the newly revamped show a try.

Produced by Larry Berns and written by director Al Lewis, Our Miss Brooks premiered on CBS on July 19, 1948. According to radio critic John Crosby, her lines were very "feline" in dialogue scenes with principal Conklin and would-be boyfriend Boynton, with sharp, witty comebacks. The interplay between the cast—blustery Conklin, nebbishy Denton, accommodating Harriet, absentminded Mrs. Davis, clueless Boynton, and scheming Miss Enright—also received positive reviews.

Jeff Chandler played Boynton and stayed with the role for five years, even after becoming a movie star. He ultimately resigned because it was too exhausting to juggle a regular radio role with his film commitments. Others in the cast included Anne Whitfield as Conklin's daughter, Harriet.

Arden won a radio listeners' poll by Radio Mirror magazine as the top-ranking comedienne of 1948–49, receiving her award at the end of an Our Miss Brooks broadcast that March. "I'm certainly going to try in the coming months to merit the honor you've bestowed upon me, because I understand that if I win this two years in a row, I get to keep Mr. Boynton", she joked. She was also a hit with the critics: a winter 1949 poll of newspaper and magazine radio editors taken by Motion Picture Daily named her the year's best radio comedienne.

For its entire radio life, the show was sponsored by Colgate-Palmolive-Peet, promoting Palmolive soap, Lustre Creme shampoo, and Toni hair-care products. The radio series continued until 1957, a year after its television life ended. This content is now available for download at the Internet Archive.

Television

The show's full cast, minus Jeff Chandler, played the same characters in the television version (with most of the scripts adapted from radio), which continued to revolve largely around Connie Brooks' daily relationships with Madison High students, colleagues, and principal. Philip Boynton was played by Robert Rockwell, who also succeeded Jeff Chandler on the radio series. The television show, sponsored by General Foods, shifted focus later in its run, moving Connie Brooks and Osgood Conklin from a public high school to an exclusive private school in the fall of 1955. It also changed the title character's romantic focus; Gene Barry was cast as physical education teacher Gene Talbot, and Connie was now the pursued instead of the pursuer, although Mr. Boynton reappeared in several episodes before the season ended.

Our Miss Brooks finished in Nielsen ratings that season at number 15 overall after previously ranking at number 23 in 1952–1953 and number 14 in 1953–1954. For the 1955–56 season, with the format change and Rockwell (as Boynton) replaced by Gene Barry, the ratings fell. To rectify their mistake, the producers brought back Rockwell as Boynton in midseason, but it did not help. The show was cancelled in the spring of 1956. However, in the theatrical film Our Miss Brooks released by Warner Bros. in the same year, Connie and Mr. Boynton were finally engaged to be married.

Awards
Both the radio and television shows drew as much attention from professional educators as from radio and television fans, viewers, and critics. In addition to the 1948–49 poll of Radio Mirror listeners and the 1949  poll of Motion Picture Daily critics, Arden's notices soon expanded beyond her media. According to the Museum of Broadcast Communications, she was made an honorary member of the National Education Association and received a 1952 award from the Teachers College of Connecticut's Alumni Association "for humanizing the American teacher".

Our Miss Brooks was considered groundbreaking for showing a woman who was neither a scatterbrained klutz nor a homebody, but rather a working woman who transcended the actual or assumed limits to women's working lives of the time. Connie Brooks was considered a realistic character in an unglamorized profession (she often joked, for example, about being underpaid, as many teachers are), and who showed women could be competent and self-sufficient outside their home lives without losing their femininity or their humanity.

Our Miss Brooks remained Eve Arden's most identifiable and popular role, with numerous surviving recordings of both the radio and television versions continuing to entertain listeners and viewers. (The surviving radio recordings include both its audition shows.) A quarter century after the show ended, Arden told radio historian John Dunning in an on-air interview just what the show and the role came to mean to her:

I originally loved the theater. I still do. And I had always wanted to have a hit on Broadway that was created by me. You know, kind of like Judy Holliday and Born Yesterday. I griped about it a little, and someone said to me, "Do you realize that if you had a hit on Broadway, probably 100 or 200,000 people might have seen you in it, if you'd stayed in it long enough. And this way, you've been in Miss Brooks, everybody loves you, and you've been seen by millions." So, I figured I'd better shut up while I was ahead.

Television cast
 Eve Arden as Connie Brooks
 Gale Gordon as Osgood Conklin
 Robert Rockwell as Phillip Boynton
 Jane Morgan as Margaret Davis
 Jesslyn Fax as Margaret Davis's sister, Angela Devon
 Richard Crenna as Walter Denton
 Gloria McMillan as Harriet Conklin
 Joseph Kearns as Superintendent Stone (eight episodes)
 William Ching as Clint Allbright (four episodes) 
 Gene Barry as Gene Talbot
 Orangey as Minerva the cat

List of television episodes

Home media

On , CBS Home Entertainment released the first season of 38 episodes on DVD (for Region 1) as a two-volume set (with 19 episodes in each volume). The episodes are not the original 26 minute broadcasts, but rather shortened syndicated versions of approximately 21 minutes each. In addition, the original opening and closing credits have been replaced by a single standardized version, eliminating all guest cast and additional crew member information.

Syndication
In the 1980s, various independent television stations would air episodes during afternoons and late nights, using tapes sourced from low-quality 16-mm prints.

Episodes from the series occasionally air on MeTV, as well as part of the regular weekday evening line-up on Decades.

Tubi has several episodes in their library.

Notes

References

Further reading

External links

 Our Miss Brooks radio episodes at Internet Archive
 
 Review of radio show at Variety

Watch online 
 Home Cooked Meal
 Madison Mascot
 The Big Jump
 This is Your Past

1940s American radio programs
1950s American radio programs
1948 radio programme debuts
1957 radio programme endings
1950s American high school television series
1950s American sitcoms
1952 American television series debuts
1956 American television series endings
American comedy radio programs
American workplace comedy television series
Black-and-white American television shows
CBS original programming
CBS Radio programs
English-language television shows
Radio programs adapted into television shows
Television series about educators
Television series based on radio series
Television series by CBS Studios